Antonino Isordia Llamazares (born 30 April 1973 in Xilitla, San Luis Potosí) is a Mexican film and documentary director known for making documentary films in a more cinematic style. His films have been shown at International Film Festivals and received awards in his native Mexico, Argentina, Austria, Canada, Chile, Colombia, Cuba, France, Germany, Spain, and the United States. He has had a documentary feature film and a documentary short each nominated for Ariel Awards.

Isordia is a graduate of the Centro de Capacitación Cinematográfica film school in Mexico City. He also attended the Berlinale Talent Campus in Berlin, Germany in 2005. His most notable films are 1973 (2005) and Los Niños Devoran Lobos (Kids Devour Wolves, 2008). His films and documentaries have won the Silver Goddess Mexican Award and the JVC award of the Guadalajara International Film Festival. He won an award for Best Video Documentary at the Valdivia International Film Festival in Valdivia, Chile in 2001 for Descenso (Descent).  1973 appeared at the Seminci Film Festival in Valladolid, Spain. In Variety Robert Koehler wrote of Isordia's work from the Palm Springs International Film Festival that:

The subject matter of Los Niños Devoran Lobos, violence among youths, was considered important enough that the rights were picked up for broadcast in 2008 on Tr3s in Mexico and MTV Latin America in Central America and several South American countries including Argentina, Bolivia, Chile, Colombia, Ecuador, Peru, and Venezuela. He directed a brief animated introduction to the first Cinema Planeta Film Festival held
in Cuernavaca, Morelos in 2009. He then produced a similar animated short, that was directed by Carlos Armella, which served as an introduction to the second Cinema Planeta Film Festival held in 2010.

Works 
In addition to directing documentaries, Antonino Isordia (also credited as Antonio Isordia) has worked on film sound, sound recording, production, and screenplay writing.

References

External links 
 Anexo:Ganadores del Festival Internacional de Cine de Valdivia (Spanish Wikipedia)
 

Mexican film directors
Mexican screenwriters
Mexican cinematographers
Mexican film producers
1973 births
Living people
People from San Luis Potosí
People from Mexico City